Ashleigh Gentle (born 25 February 1991 in South Brisbane, Queensland) is an Australian triathlete who was selected as part of the team for the 2016 Summer Olympics in Rio de Janeiro. She took second overall in the 2017 ITU World Triathlon Series, her career best to date.

Biography 
Gentle was born in South Brisbane, Queensland, on 25 February 1991, but now lives on the Gold Coast. She has two brothers. She attended St Vincent's Primary School and All Saints Anglican School. In 2009, she entered Griffith University, where , she is studying for a Bachelor of Public Health degree in nutrition. She has trained with the Australian Institute of Sport and the Queensland Academy of Sport. Her partner is long distance triathlete Josh Amberger.

At school, Gentle participated in many different sports, including touch football, netball, athletics and cross country running. In 2004, a family friend persuaded her to take up triathlon. Initially this was to improve her running times, but she soon found that she enjoyed the swimming and cycling too. She won silver at the Junior World Championships in Hamburg in 2007 and Vancouver in 2008 before winning in Budapest in 2010.

In 2011, she ran in her first ITU World Triathlon Series (WTS) event, and was placed ninth. She finished in 130th position in the 2010 ITU World Championship Series. In 2012 and 2013, she ran in ten WTS events, and was placed in the top ten in all of them. In years 2011—2014 Gentle placed in the final ITU series rankings at 24th, 15th, 7th, and 34th place.

In 2015, Gentle finished the year in 12th position in that year's ITU series while also placing first in the Escape from Alcatraz triathlon, a non-standard distance triathlon starting on Alcatraz island. In 2015 and 2016 she placed second at the ITU races in Yokohama in 2015 and 2016, as well as at the ITU race in Abu Dhabi in 2016. By May 2016, she was ranked third in the world which helped solidify the Australian Olympic Committee's selection of Gentle as one of three female triathletes who would represent Australia at the 2016 Summer Olympics in Rio de Janeiro, her first Olympics. Gentle would place 26th overall in the Olympic event. Gentle would then finish out the 2016 ITU World Triathlon Series with and overall series ranking of 10th place.

Gentle had her highest ITU series finish, placing year in 2nd overall in the 2017 ITU World Triathlon Series. The next year, at the final race of the 2018 season in Gold Coast, Gentle managed to distance her rivals Vicky Holland and Katie Zaferes on the run to finish first, with Holland winning the subsequent sprint with Zaferes for second place to take the 2018 ITU World Triathlon Series Grand Finale race. She finished the season in 6th position.

In 2019, Gentle took gold for the second time of competing in the Escape from Alcatraz triathlon, a non-standard distance triathlon starting on Alcatraz island.

Notable performances

Notes

External links

 
 
 
 
 

Australian female triathletes
1991 births
Living people
Triathletes at the 2016 Summer Olympics
Olympic triathletes of Australia
Triathletes at the 2018 Commonwealth Games
Commonwealth Games medallists in triathlon
Commonwealth Games gold medallists for Australia
Triathletes at the 2020 Summer Olympics
21st-century Australian women
Sportspeople from Brisbane
Sportswomen from Queensland
Medallists at the 2018 Commonwealth Games